The Marichuela Formation (N1m) is a geological formation of the Bogotá savanna, Altiplano Cundiboyacense, Eastern Ranges of the Colombian Andes. The formation consists of coarse to very coarse conglomerates.

Etymology 
The formation was defined by Helmens and Van der Hammen in 1995 and named after the Marichuela neighbourhood of Usme. Part of the Marichuela Formation had been included in the Conos de Tunjuelo, defined by Julivert in 1961.

Description

Lithologies 
The Marichuela Formation consists of coarse to very coarse conglomerates.

Stratigraphy and depositional environment 
The Marichuela Formation unconformably overlies the Cretaceous rocks of the Guadalupe Group. The age has been estimated to be Late Miocene to Early Pliocene. The depositional environment has been interpreted as alluvial fans, caused by earthquakes or heavy rains.

Outcrops 

The Marichuela Formation is apart from its type locality in the Usme Synclinal, the valley of the Tunjuelo River, found in the synclinals of Neusa, Sisga and La Calera.

Regional correlations

See also 

 Geology of the Eastern Hills
 Geology of the Ocetá Páramo
 Geology of the Altiplano Cundiboyacense

Notes

References

Bibliography

Maps

External links 
 

Geologic formations of Colombia
Neogene Colombia
Messinian
Tortonian
Miocene Series of South America
Pliocene Series of South America
Montehermosan
Huayquerian
Conglomerate formations
Alluvial deposits
Formations
Geography of Cundinamarca Department
Geography of Bogotá